The Campeonato Nacional General Artigas was a Uruguayan football tournament organized by the Uruguayan Football Association from 1960 to 1962.

It was the first attempt to hold a championship that would integrate teams from the capital and the interior of the country.

List of champions

Titles by club

References

H
Recurring sporting events established in 1960
1960 establishments in Uruguay